The Plaid Cymru Member of Parliament for Ceredigion, Cynog Dafis, was unexpectedly elected to the National Assembly for Wales in May 1999 and decided to give up his seat in the House of Commons in order to concentrate on his work in the Assembly. By accepting the office of Crown Steward and Bailiff of the Manor of Northstead on 10 January 2000, he formally vacated his seat.

Plaid Cymru selected Simon Thomas, who had been their Director of Policy and responsible for writing their manifestos for the 1997 general election and 1999 Assembly election. Labour, who had come second in the previous general election, chose a local social worker, Maria Battle.

The election campaign was dominated by the issue of European Objective 1 funding. The constituency was part of the area of Wales that was granted Objective One status in 1999, but under European rules the funding had to be matched by a minimum of 25% from other sources, including private funding and resources from central and local government.  Plaid Cymru, Conservative and Liberal Democrat politicians demanded this funding be made available solely from central government in addition to the block grant already paid to the Welsh Assembly by the UK Treasury, and the chief reporter for Wales on Sunday newspaper Martin Shipton stood as a single-issue candidate demanding 'Match Funding now'. The Labour administration in the Welsh Assembly insisted that such a demand misrepresented the resourcing of Objective 1 programmes.

Polling day in the by-election was 3 February. Plaid Cymru retained the seat comfortably, with the Liberal Democrats taking second in a seat they had previously held from 1974 until 1992 – and would win again in 2005.

Electoral history

Results

References

External links
Campaign literature from the by-election

Elections in Ceredigion
History of Ceredigion
By-elections to the Parliament of the United Kingdom in Welsh constituencies
2000 in Wales
2000s elections in Wales
2000 elections in the United Kingdom
20th century in Ceredigion